Kangaroo Flats Training Area (KFTA) was initially established in the late 1970s as a field firing range for the Australian Army's North-West Mobile Force (NORFORCE). Located near Berry Springs, Northern Territory, it has since grown to about  5,000 hectares in size and accommodates multiple field firing ranges.

An expansion in 1999 allowed for the construction of a 150-person camp, including generators, septic systems, bore water, car parking, kitchens, toilets, mess and administration facilities. Facilities include five training ranges including sneaker lanes, a gallery range, snap range, section defence range and an assault grenade range.

The training area is currently utilised by Indigenous recruits from NORFORCE, as well as general field weapons training for other military units.

References

Buildings and structures in Darwin, Northern Territory
Barracks in Australia
Military installations in the Northern Territory